The Battle of Mandsaur took place in Mandsaur, India between the Maratha Army and Jai Singh II of Amber.

Battle 
In February 1732, the Marathas completely surrounded Jai Singh with their enormous cavalry and started cutting of his supplies. The Jaipur Raja was forced to sue for peace, he offered the marathas six lakhs, but Holkar refused and demanded more. While the negotiations were taking place, a rumour surfaced about reinforcements from the emperor. This raised the morale of the Jaipur army and the Rajputs got ready for battle, the Marathas quickly attacked the rearguard of the Jaipur army and killed its commander. The Rajputs also attacked and killed fifteen Maratha officers in the fight that followed. Holkar and his men retreated 30 miles away from the battlefield. Jai Singh followed them but was outpaced by the Maratha cavalry who reached Jai Singhs camp and forced him to surrender.

Aftermath 
Jai Singh was forced to give six lakhs to Holkar and allow him to collect chauth from 28 pargana's in Malwa.

The Maratha victory at the Battle of Mandsaur had the following consequences:
Scindias and Holkars were emboldened to renew their attack on Rajputana.
Kota and Bundi were made the next targets in the same year by the Marathas.

See also 
 Battles involving the Maratha Empire

References 

History of Madhya Pradesh
Mandsaur
1733 in India
Mandsaur
Mandsaur